Edgar Samuel Ford (20 May 1876 – 11 April 1943) was an English first-class cricketer.

Ford was born at Bradford-on-Avon in May 1876. He made his debut for Wiltshire in minor counties cricket in the 1899 Minor Counties Championship. He played minor counties cricket for Wiltshire until 1903, making a total of 23 appearances in the Minor Counties Championship. He made a single appearance in first-class cricket as a wicket-keeper when he played for London County against Leicestershire at Crystal Palace in 1902. He died at Cranmore on the Isle of Wight in April 1943.

References

External links

1876 births
1943 deaths
People from Bradford-on-Avon
English cricketers
Wiltshire cricketers
London County cricketers